The 2008 WNBA season was their tenth season and their sixth in Connecticut. The Sun successfully advanced to the WNBA Playoffs for the sixth consecutive season. Lindsay Whalen was a key contributor to the club, averaging 14.0 points per game, 5.6 rebounds per game, and 5.4 assists per game.

Offseason

Expansion Draft
The following player was lost in the Atlanta Dream expansion draft:
 Erika DeSouza

WNBA Draft

Transactions
August 27: The Sun signed Svetlana Abrosimova and waived Jolene Anderson.
June 27: The Sun waived Kamesha Hairston.
May 15: The Sun waived Cori Chambers.
May 7: The Sun waived Jessica Foley, Tracy Gahan and Christina Quaye.
May 6: The Sun waived Meredith Alexis and Natalie Berglin.
April 28: The Sun waived Crystal Erwin, Laura Hall and Jessica Richter.
April 23: The Sun waived Antoinette Upshaw.
March 20: The Sun signed Tracy Gahan to a training camp contract.
March 7: The Sun signed Sandrine Gruda.
March 5: The Sun signed Jessica Foley to a training camp contract.
March 3: The Sun signed Natalie Berglin and Kerri Gardin to training camp contracts.
February 19: The Sun re-signed free agents Lindsay Whalen and Jamie Carey.

Free agents

Additions

Subtractions

Roster

Season standings

Schedule

Preseason

|-  style="text-align:center; background:#fbb;"
| 1 || May 1 || @ Minnesota ||  || L 57-68 || Gardin (8) || Gahan, Gardin, Holt (4) || Carey, Hairston, Turner (2) || Target Center  1,155 || 0-1
|-  style="text-align:center; background:#bfb;"
| 2 || May 4 || Phoenix ||  || W 94-66 || Holt (15) || Gahan (10) || Swanier, Berglin (3) || Mohegan Sun Arena  6,252 || 1-1
|-  style="text-align:center; background:#bfb;"
| 3 || May 9 || Houston ||  || W 88-80 || Whalen (18) || Anderson (7) || Whalen (8) || Mohegan Sun Arena  4,411 || 2-1
|-

Regular season

|-  style="text-align:center; background:#bfb;"
| 1 || May 17 || Atlanta || CSS || W 100-67 || Whitmore (22) || Whitmore (10) || Whalen (8) || Mohegan Sun Arena  7,420 || 1-0
|-  style="text-align:center; background:#bfb;"
| 2 || May 18 || @ New York || WCTXNBA TV|| W 77-63 || Whitmore (17) || Whalen, Raymond (6) || Whalen (8) || Madison Square Garden  10,460 || 2-0
|-  style="text-align:center; background:#bfb;"
| 3 || May 24 || Sacramento ||  || W 87-64 || Whalen (21) || Holt (7) || Whalen, Whitmore (5) || Mohegan Sun Arena  6,402 || 3-0
|-  style="text-align:center; background:#fbb;"
| 4 || May 27 || Indiana || ESPN2 || L 46-75 || Whalen (11) || Jones (7) || Whalen (5) || Mohegan Sun Arena  5,245 || 3-1
|-  style="text-align:center; background:#bfb;"
| 5 || May 30 || New York || MSGNBA TV || W 89-84 || Whitmore (18) || Whalen (6) || Whalen (7) || Mohegan Sun Arena  7,052 || 4-1
|-

|-  style="text-align:center; background:#bfb;"
| 6 || June 1 || @ Chicago ||  || W 75-73 || Whalen, Whitmore (19) || Whalen (7) || Whalen (7) || UIC Pavilion  2,276 || 5-1
|-  style="text-align:center; background:#bfb;"
| 7 || June 6 || Minnesota ||  || W 78-77 || Jones (25) || Whalen (9) || Anderson, Gardin (5) || Mohegan Sun Arena  6,327 || 6-1
|-  style="text-align:center; background:#bfb;"
| 8 || June 8 || Washington || WCTXNBA TV || W 87-79 || Jones (16) || Whalen (7) || Whalen (7) || Mohegan Sun Arena  7,174 || 7-1
|-  style="text-align:center; background:#bfb;"
| 9 || June 10 || @ Minnesota || ESPN2 || W 75-66 || Jones (18) || Whitmore (12) || Whalen (6) || Target Center  7,186 || 8-1
|-  style="text-align:center; background:#fbb;"
| 10 || June 13 || @ Los Angeles ||  || L 93-98 (OT) || Whalen (20) || Whalen (7) || Jones (3) || STAPLES Center  8,702 || 8-2
|-  style="text-align:center; background:#bfb;"
| 11 || June 16 || @ Seattle || WCTXNBA TV || W 74-67 || Jones (15) || Raymond (9) || Whitmore (4) || KeyArena  6,872 || 9-2
|-  style="text-align:center; background:#fbb;"
| 12 || June 18 || @ Phoenix ||  || L 81-102 || Jones (18) || Turner (5) || Whalen (5) || US Airways Center  4,478 || 9-3
|-  style="text-align:center; background:#bfb;"
| 13 || June 20 || @ Sacramento ||  || W 72-56 || Jones (14) || Whalen, Anderson (6) || Whalen (5) || ARCO Arena  5,895 || 10-3
|-  style="text-align:center; background:#bfb;"
| 14 || June 24 || Detroit || WCTXNBA TV || W 85-68 || Jones (20) || Holt (8) || Whalen (6) || Mohegan Sun Arena  7,501 || 11-3
|-  style="text-align:center; background:#fbb;"
| 15 || June 26 || @ Detroit || FSN-D || L 61-70 || Jones (14) || Jones (7) || Whalen (4) || Mohegan Sun Arena  7,501 || 11-4
|-  style="text-align:center; background:#bfb;"
| 16 || June 27 || Atlanta ||  || W 109-101 (OT) || Jones (30) || Jones, Whalen (10) || Holt (8) || Mohegan Sun Arena  7,612 || 12-4
|-  style="text-align:center; background:#fbb;"
| 17 || June 29 || Phoenix ||  || L 80-87 || Jones (16) || Jones (9) || Whalen (8) || Mohegan Sun Arena  9,518 (sellout) || 12-5
|-

|-  style="text-align:center; background:#bfb;"
| 18 || July 1 || Houston ||  || W 78-68 || Jones (15) || Turner (9) || Whalen (9) || Mohegan Sun Arena  6,357 || 13-5
|-  style="text-align:center; background:#fbb;"
| 19 || July 5 || @ Indiana || FSN-INBA TV || L 74-81 || Jones (20) || Gardin (9) || Jones, Whalen (3) || Conseco Fieldhouse  6,329 || 13-6
|-  style="text-align:center; background:#fbb;"
| 20 || July 8 || @ Detroit || FSN-D || L 82-88 || Jones (21) || Whalen (7) || Jones, Whalen (8) || Palace of Auburn Hills  7,623 || 13-7
|-  style="text-align:center; background:#fbb;"
| 21 || July 13 || @ Washington || ABC || L 64-69 || Whalen (33) || Whalen (8) || Jones, Whalen (6) || Verizon Center  9,610 || 13-8
|-  style="text-align:center; background:#fbb;"
| 22 || July 15 || New York || ESPN2 || L 71-77 || Whalen (19) || Jones (9) || Jones (5) || Mohegan Sun Arena  8,244 || 13-9
|-  style="text-align:center; background:#fbb;"
| 23 || July 18 || @ Chicago || WCTXNBA TV || L 65-73 || Jones (18) || Gruda (11) || Jones, Swanier (3) || UIC Pavilion  3,379 || 13-10
|-  style="text-align:center; background:#bfb;"
| 24 || July 20 || Chicago ||  || W 74-67 || Jones (23) || Jones (10) || Whalen (6) || Mohegan Sun Arena  7,367 || 14-10
|-  style="text-align:center; background:#bfb;"
| 25 || July 24 || Los Angeles || WCTXNBA TV || W 87-61 || Whalen (22) || Jones (8) || Whalen (4) || Mohegan Sun Arena  9,518 (sellout) || 15-10
|-  style="text-align:center; background:#bfb;"
| 26 || July 27 || @ Washington || CSN-MANBA TV || W 82-60 || Jones (27) || Whalen (8) || Whalen (7) || Verizon Center  9,357 || 16-10
|-

|-
| colspan="10"  style="text-align:center; vertical-align:middle;"| Summer Olympic break
|-  style="text-align:center; background:#bfb;"
| 27 || August 28 || @ Indiana || FSN-INBA TV || W 84-58 || Whitmore (15) || Turner, Raymond (5) || Gruda, Jones (4) || Conseco Fieldhouse  6,435 || 17-10
|-  style="text-align:center; background:#bfb;"
| 28 || August 29 || @ Atlanta ||  || W 98-72 || Whitmore (27) || Whitmore (6) || Whalen (8) || Philips Arena  11,442 (sellout) || 18-10
|-  style="text-align:center; background:#bfb;"
| 29 || August 31 || Seattle || ABC || W 80-76 || Jones (20) || Holt (5) || Gardin (4) || Mohegan Sun Arena  9,518 (sellout) || 19-10
|-

|-  style="text-align:center; background:#bfb;"
| 30 || September 5 || Chicago ||  || W 80-75 || Whitmore (17) || Jones (6) || Whalen (6) || Mohegan Sun Arena  8,088 || 20-10
|-  style="text-align:center; background:#fbb;"
| 31 || September 7 || San Antonio || ABC || L 73-85 || Jones (22) || Jones (9) || Abrosimova (6) || Mohegan Sun Arena  7,956 || 20-11
|-  style="text-align:center; background:#fbb;"
| 32 || September 9 || @ Houston || WCTX || L 68-75 || Jones (22) || Whalen (8) || Whalen (5) || Reliant Arena  5,769 || 20-12
|-  style="text-align:center; background:#fbb;"
| 33 || September 11 || @ San Antonio ||  || L 74-78 || Jones (18) || Gardin (14) || Carey (7) || AT&T Center  6,791 || 20-13
|-  style="text-align:center; background:#bfb;"
| 34 || September 13 || Washington || WCTXNBA TV || W 87-81 || Phillips (18) || Phillips (8) || Gruda, Swanier (4) || Mohegan Sun Arena  8,652 || 21-13
|-

Playoffs
In the first round of the Eastern Conference Playoffs, the Sun had to face the New York Liberty. Since the Sun had the better record, the series would be played with game 1 at New York, game 2 at Connecticut, and game 3 (if needed) at Connecticut. The Liberty won the first game, but the Sun won the second to force a game three. The Sun were upset on their home floor by the Liberty and were eliminated from the playoffs.
For the sixth consecutive season, the Sun advance to the playoffs.
For the second consecutive season, the Sun do not advance to the Eastern Conference Finals.

|-  style="text-align:center; background:#fbb;"
| 1 || September 18 || @ New York || MSGNBA TV || L 63-72 || Whitmore (16) || Jones, Whitmore (6) || Whalen (6) || Madison Square Garden  7,649 || 0-1
|-  style="text-align:center; background:#bfb;"
| 2 || September 20 || New York || MSGNBA TV || W 73-70 || Jones (16) || Whitmore (6) || Whalen (4) || Mohegan Sun Arena  7,234 || 1-1
|-  style="text-align:center; background:#fbb;"
| 3 || September 22 || New York || ESPN2 || L 62-66 || Whalen (19) || Jones (11) || Whitmore (4) || Mohegan Sun Arena  6,011 || 1-2
|-

Depth

Regular Season statistics

Player statistics

Team statistics

Team Ranking
This table shows how the Sun rank compared to the other teams in the league (14 total teams):

Playoffs statistics

Player statistics

Team statistics

Awards and honors
Head Coach Mike Thibault was named 2008 WNBA Coach of the Year.
Lindsay Whalen was named to the All-WNBA First Team.
Asjha Jones was named to the All-WNBA Second Team.
Amber Holt was named to the All-Rookie Team.
Lindsay Whalen was given the Peak Performer award (for assists) for leading the league in assists per game (5.4).
Lindsay Whalen was the second player in WNBA history to average at least 10 points, 5 rebounds, and 5 assists per game for the season. Only Nikki Teasley has previously accomplished this feat.
Lindsay Whalen was named WNBA Eastern Conference Player of the Week for the week of May 27, 2008.
Asjha Jones was named WNBA Eastern Conference Player of the Week for the week of June 30, 2008.
Lindsay Whalen was named WNBA Eastern Conference Player of the Week for the week of July 14, 2008.
Asjha Jones was named WNBA Eastern Conference Player of the Week for the week of July 28, 2008.

Attendance
A sellout for a basketball game at Mohegan Sun Arena is 9,518.

References

External links

Connecticut Sun seasons
Connecticut
Connecticut Sun